The 1996 Tippeligaen was the 52nd completed season of top division football in Norway. Each team played 26 games with 3 points given for wins and 1 for draws. Number twelve, thirteen and fourteen are relegated. The winners of the two groups of the first division (second tier) are promoted, as well as the winner of a play-off match between the two second placed teams in the two groups of the first division. This was the last time the first division was organized into two groups – from 1997 and onwards the first division has had all teams play in the same league.

Teams and locations
Note: Table lists in alphabetical order.

League table

Relegation and promotion 
 Haugesund, Sogndal and Lyn were promoted.
 Moss, Vålerenga, and Start were relegated.
 Sogndal won the play-offs against Odd Grenland, 5–1 on aggregate.
 Match 1: Sogndal 4–1 Odd Grenland
 Match 2: Odd Grenland 0–1 Sogndal

Results

Season statistics

Top scorers

Attendances

References 

Eliteserien seasons
Norway
Norway
1